Adak Airport  is a state-owned public-use airport located west of Adak, on Adak Island in the Aleutian Islands in the U.S. state of Alaska. The airport is the farthest western airfield with scheduled passenger air service in the entire United States at 176.64W.

Adak's airport is one of the largest and most sophisticated airports in the Aleutian Islands. Built by the U.S. Navy for Naval air transport, the airport is a world-class facility consisting of a  runway and a  runway (perm closed fall 2015), equipped with an Instrument Landing System and glideslope which facilitate Instrument Flight Rules landings.  Adak currently has scheduled jet service, every Wednesday and Saturday, provided by Alaska Airlines.

As per the Federal Aviation Administration, this airport had 1,989 passenger boardings (enplanements) in calendar year 2008, 1,907 in 2009, and 2,097 in 2010. The National Plan of Integrated Airport Systems for 2011–2015 categorized it as a general aviation facility (the commercial service category requires at least 2,500 enplanements per year).

History 
The military first developed an air station on Adak during World War II.  Adak Army Airfield was used during the Aleutian Campaign by both USAAF and Naval Air units, particularly in defensive actions against Japanese forces occupying Attu and Kiska.

Following the war, the AAF turned Adak over to the United States Air Force until 1950, and then to the Navy who established anti-submarine warfare base there. Adak was most recently run by the U.S. Navy as a deployment base for P-3 Orion maritime patrol aircraft, primarily to conduct antisubmarine warfare operations against submarines and surveillance of naval surface vessels of the former Soviet Union. As many as 5,000 US personnel lived at the base during the Cold War, many with families.

Adak was also used as a refueling stop for transpacific passenger flights. Pan Am first operated a Seattle-Adak-Tokyo flight in 1946 to demonstrate the viability of a transpacific great circle route to the United Nations Relief and Rehabilitation Administration.

On 31 March 1997, the Navy closed Adak Naval Air Facility. A large portion of the former military facility's property was transferred to the Aleut Corporation in 2004 and became a National Wildlife Refuge.

Facilities and aircraft 
Adak Airport resides at elevation of 18 feet (5 m) above mean sea level. It has two runways with asphalt surfaces: 5/23 is 7,790 by 200 feet (2,374 x 61 m) and 18/36 is 7,605 by 200 feet (2,318 x 61 m).  Runway 18/36 is now permanently closed for all operations.

For the 12-month period ending January 2, 2011, the airport had 340 aircraft operations, an average of 28 per month: 62.4% scheduled commercial, 29.4% general aviation, and 8.2% military.

Airline and destination 

Scheduled passenger service is subsidized by the Essential Air Service (EAS) program. Alaska Airlines operates two flights weekly, on Wednesdays and Saturdays, using Boeing 737-700 jet aircraft and previously with Boeing 737-400 and 737-800 jet aircraft.

Statistics

Historical airline service

Reeve Aleutian Airways (RAA) served Adak from the late 1940s until 2000 when the airline ceased all flight operations and went out of business.  In 1948, Reeve Aleutian was operating Douglas DC-3 service once a week between Anchorage and the airport.  From the 1970s through the early 1980s, the airline was operating nonstop service several times a week from Adak to Anchorage (ANC) with Lockheed L-188 Electra turboprop aircraft.  Reeve Aleutian also operated nonstop Electra propjet service from the airport to Attu Island during the 1970s.  Jet service arrived during the mid 1980s with Reeve Aleutian operating Boeing 727-100 jetliners from the airport nonstop to Anchorage twice a week.  By 1989, the airline was operating nonstop 727 service three times a week from Adak to Anchorage.  In 1994, Reeve Aleutian was operating four direct flights a week between the airport and Anchorage with Boeing 727-100 jets configured for combi aircraft passenger/freight operations with all of these flights making intermediate stop in each direction at the Cold Bay Airport in the Aleutian Islands.
In 2020 and 2021, the flight to Adak would stop in Cold Bay to assist with the shutdown of commuter flights from Anchorage to Cold Bay and Unalaska. The stop was discontinued in Summer 2021.

References

Other sources 

 
 Essential Air Service documents (Docket DOT-OST-2000-8556) from the U.S. Department of Transportation:
 Order 2004-6-24 (June 25, 2004): re-selecting Alaska Airlines to provide essential air service at Adak, Alaska, at an annual subsidy rate of $1,617,923, for the period May 1, 2004, through June 30, 2006.
 Order 2006-5-21 (May 23, 2006): re-selecting Alaska Airlines to provide essential air service at Adak, Alaska, at an annual subsidy rate of $1,393,384, and Peninsula Airways for $449,605 at Atka and $314,694 at Nikolski. The three rates extend through June 30, 2008.
 Order 2008-3-36 (March 31, 2008): re-selecting Alaska Airlines to provide essential air service at Adak, Alaska, at an annual subsidy rate of $1,483,122, and Peninsula Airways for $513,803 at Atka and $469,786 at Nikolski. The three rates extend through June 30, 2010.
 Order 2010-7-9 (July 15, 2010): re-selecting Alaska Airlines to provide essential air service (EAS) at Adak, Alaska, at an annual subsidy rate of $1,675,703, and Peninsula Airways, Inc., for $290,780 at Atka and $639,008 at Nikolski. The three rates extend through June 30, 2012.
 Order 2012-9-10 (September 11, 2012): re-selecting Alaska Airlines, Inc. to provide Essential Air Service (EAS) at Adak, Alaska, consisting of two nonstop or one-stop round trips per week with Boeing 737 combi aircraft between Adak and Anchorage for an annual rate of $1,675,703, for only a one-year period.
 Order 2013-7-14 (July 16, 2013): re-selecting Alaska Airlines, Inc., to provide Essential Air Service (EAS) at Adak, Alaska, for $2,057,114 annual subsidy from October 1, 2013, through September 30, 2015.

External links 
 

Airports in the Aleutians West Census Area, Alaska
Essential Air Service
Aleutian Islands campaign
Superfund sites in Alaska
Adak, Alaska